This is a list of international trips made by Serzh Sargsyan, the third President of Armenia:

First Term (2008-2013)

2008

2009

2010

2011

2012

2013

Second Term (2013-2018)

2013

2014

2015

2016

2017

2018

References 

Lists of diplomatic trips
State visits by Armenian leaders
Politics of Armenia
Diplomatic visits by heads of state